Karl Larsen (born September 25, 1968) is an American photographer who is known for photographing several celebrities. His best known shot is one of Paris Hilton crying in the back of a police car after she was sentenced to serve time in jail for driving while intoxicated.

Early life
Larsen was born in Brooklyn, New York, however, considers upstate Woodstock, New York his hometown. He graduated with a B.S. from Binghamton University in 1991.

Career
Larsen started his professional career in 1997 by being the house photographer for the House of Blues in West Hollywood.  Larsen would also shoot his friends in bands such as The Start and Stargunn on the Sunset Strip. His photos of a crying Paris Hilton in the back seat of a Los Angeles County Sheriff's cruiser on June 8, 2007 were published worldwide; however, Larsen was photographing Hilton alongside photographer Nick Ut. Two photographs emerged; the more famous photo of Hilton was credited to Ut despite being Larsen's photo.

Rolling Stone magazine
Larsen has been a contributing photographer for Rolling Stone magazine since 2002, taking portraits of bands from The Doors of the 21st Century to Velvet Revolver.

Personal life
Larsen married Brazilian native Anelize Ferrer Flores in 2005. They currently live in Hollywood, California

In 2022, Larsen began publishing videos on the YouTube channel Remarkable Friendship together with photographer Thomas Markle, although Markle claims to have severed their relationship after recording their last video.

Filmography

Books

References

1968 births
Living people
Concert photographers
American photographers
Binghamton University alumni